Palestine Street or Falastin Street is a street located in eastern Baghdad. It runs parallel and to the west of Army Canal between Mustanssiriya square, through Beirut square to Maysalon square, in the neighborhoods of Mustansiriya, Nile, Al-Muthanna to the west and 14 July, Al-Idrisi, the Martyr Monument, and AlMuthanna to the east.

The street was established in the 1960s when the government started a plan to extend Baghdad by adding new neighborhoods.

A recent incident took place on Falastin Street where a number of Westerners were kidnapped, in a snatch operation that reportedly involved up to 40 gunmen traveling in an official-looking convoy. A security source told the independent news agency Voices of Iraq that the incident took place in Falastin Street, eastern Baghdad. "Gunmen stopped a vehicle and brought out its passengers, believed to be carrying German passports, at gunpoint, and took them in a vehicle to an unknown place," said the source, who declined to be named.

According to the Iraqi Interior Ministry official, the New York Times reports, the attack occurred just outside the Technology and Information Directorate, a section of the Finance Ministry located on Palestine Street, a religiously mixed area near Sadr City.

The Palestine Street area has witnessed many recent reconstruction efforts, whereby many trees were planted by Baghdad municipality, and fountains and playgrounds were constructed. Palestinian Street is the leading commercial and shopping center in eastern Baghdad.

References

 The Musical Culture of Iraqi Jewry: Three Countries and Two Continents by Galia Ben-Mordechai
 "Along Palestine Street, a once vibrant commercial district, shop owners were relieved not by the greater military presence, but by the absence of Mahdi Army militiamen from neighboring Sadr City, the impoverished Shiite district and militia stronghold." from Baghdad Plan Has Elusive Targets, Washington Post. Published February 26, 2007.
 U.S. Soldiers Kill 2 Iraqis After Bomb Explodes Near Convoy by Edward Wong. Published January 12, 2004.
 "In years gone by, Palestine Street was the site of one of the biggest celebrations of Baath party control." Baghdad not in party mood By Jonny Dymond. BBC News, 18 July 2003.
 Baghdad streets
 Visiting US Consulate: Crossing the Road Can Be Hazardous, Arab News.

Palestine
Streets in Baghdad